Miss Mexico 2021 was the 4th edition of the Miss Mexico pageant and it was held on Thursday, July 1, 2021, at the Salón Lago Di Como by Castalia in Chihuahua City, Chihuahua, Mexico. Last year's winner, Ashley Alvídrez Estrada of Chihuahua crowned her successor, Karolina Vidales Valdovinos of Michoacán, at the end of the event. Vidales will represent Mexico at Miss World 2021.

Final results

Placements

Regional Queens of Beauty

Special Awards

Challenges

Beauty With a Purpose

Talent

Beach Beauty

Top Model

Sports

Head to Head Challenge

Dances of México

Multimedia

Self Makeup Challenge

Official Delegates

Contestants

Notes

Replacements
 – Arianny Sarays Tenorio Mejías (Arianny Tenorio) resigned her state title for personal reasons by her own free will. As a result, Jéssica Lizet Rodríguez Farjat (Jessica Farjat) was designated as the new Miss Ciudad de México/Miss Mexico City 2019/2020.
 – Alejandra Huerta was stripped from the Miss Morelos title on March 9 for breach of contract, so the 1st Runner-Up, Fernanda Hutterer, was crowned as the new Miss Morelos 2019.
 – Alejandra Ávila was removed from her title due to lack of commitment and interest. Blessing Chukwu, who was the 1st Runner-Up of the state pageant, was appointed as the new Miss Nayarit 2019.
 – Alexa Muñiz resigned from being Miss San Luis Potosí for personal reasons, for which Daniela Sánchez was appointed as the state representative to replace her.
 – Gildy Guillermina Reyes Colorado (Gildy Reyes) resigned days prior to the competition for personal reasons, her title was then given to Paloma Zurita, who was contestant at Miss Puebla.

Death of Miss Aguascalientes
On 1st of January 2021, Miss Aguascalientes, Ximena Hita was found lifeless on her apartment. As per investigation, Authorities are suspecting suicide on the cause of her death. There were no replacement for her.

References

External links
Official Website

2021 in Mexico
2021 beauty pageants
Beauty pageants in Mexico